Crambus cypridalis is a moth in the family Crambidae. It was described by George Duryea Hulst in 1886. It is found in North America, where it has been recorded from California, Colorado, Montana, New Mexico and Washington.

The wingspan is about 28 mm. Adults are on wing from June to November.

The larvae probably feed on grasses.

References

Crambini
Moths described in 1886
Moths of North America